NGC 3190 is a spiral galaxy with tightly wound arms and lying in the constellation Leo. It was discovered by William Herschel in 1784. NGC 3190 is member of Hickson 44 galaxy group, estimated at around 80 million light years away, and consisting of four galaxies in a tight group - NGC 3193 is fairly featureless, NGC 3187 is a dim but striking spiral galaxy and NGC 3185 has a barred spiral structure with an outer ring. It is also a member of the NGC 3190 Group of galaxies, which is a member of the Leo II Groups, a series of galaxies and galaxy clusters strung out from the right edge of the Virgo Supercluster.

In 2002 two supernovae were observed in the galaxy. A Brazilian amateur astronomer Paulo Cacella detected one supernova in the southeastern part in March 2002 (SN 2002bo), and then an Italian team, while studying the first one, detected a second supernova (SN 2002cv) on the other side two months later.

In 2012 Apple Inc used a blue tinted image of NGC 3190 as their desktop image for their release of OS X Mountain Lion.

See also
Hickson Compact Group

References

External links

AOP: NGC 3190 Group
Astronomy Picture of the Day - Spiral Galaxy NGC 3190 Almost Sideways 2010 May 3

Unbarred spiral galaxies
NGC 3190
3190
30083
Hickson Compact Groups
17840312